Long San is a Kenyah settlement in the Marudi division of Sarawak, Malaysia.

This extensive village on the Baram river is the principal home of Kenyah culture (arts, crafts, music and dance) and has become increasingly popular as a tourist destination: the Long San Guesthouse provides accommodation for visitors. Access is either by boat or a 4½ hour drive from Miri by 4WD vehicle along old logging roads. If the Baram Dam hydroelectric project goes ahead, Long San will be one of the villages affected by the flooding of 389,000 hectares of jungle.

Neighbouring settlements include:

References

Long San is in the Telang Usan District, Miri Division.

Villages in Sarawak